The 2002–03 St. Louis Blues season was the 36th for the franchise in St. Louis, Missouri. The Blues finished the regular-season with a record of 41 wins, 24 losses, 11 overtime losses and 6 ties, good for 99 points, and the team qualified for the Stanley Cup playoffs for the 24th consecutive season, only to lose in the Western Conference Quarterfinals to the Vancouver Canucks in seven games.

Captain Chris Pronger missed most of the regular season with an injured wrist. Al MacInnis filled in as interim captain and continued to serve in the role through the end of the season even after Pronger returned to the lineup.

Off-season

Regular season
January 14, 2003: the Blues scored three short-handed goals in a 4–1 road win over the Phoenix Coyotes. 
April 6, 2003: In a game against the St. Louis Blues, Patrick Roy of the Colorado Avalanche played the last regular season game of his career. The Avalanche won the game by a score of 5–2. It was Roy's 1,029th game, and his 551st victory.

Final standings

Playoffs

Schedule and results

Regular season

|- align="center" bgcolor="#FFBBBB"
|1||L||October 10, 2002||3–4 || align="left"| Mighty Ducks of Anaheim (2002–03) ||0–1–0–0 || 
|- align="center" 
|2||T||October 12, 2002||2–2 OT|| align="left"| Minnesota Wild (2002–03) ||0–1–1–0 || 
|- align="center" bgcolor="#CCFFCC" 
|3||W||October 15, 2002||2–1 OT|| align="left"| Carolina Hurricanes (2002–03) ||1–1–1–0 || 
|- align="center" bgcolor="#CCFFCC" 
|4||W||October 17, 2002||7–1 || align="left"| Columbus Blue Jackets (2002–03) ||2–1–1–0 || 
|- align="center" bgcolor="#CCFFCC" 
|5||W||October 19, 2002||5–3 || align="left"| Dallas Stars (2002–03) ||3–1–1–0 || 
|- align="center" bgcolor="#CCFFCC" 
|6||W||October 24, 2002||2–1 || align="left"| @ Edmonton Oilers (2002–03) ||4–1–1–0 || 
|- align="center" bgcolor="#CCFFCC" 
|7||W||October 26, 2002||4–3 OT|| align="left"| @ Calgary Flames (2002–03) ||5–1–1–0 || 
|- align="center" bgcolor="#CCFFCC" 
|8||W||October 30, 2002||7–0 || align="left"| Nashville Predators (2002–03) ||6–1–1–0 || 
|-

|- align="center" bgcolor="#CCFFCC" 
|9||W||November 2, 2002||6–1 || align="left"| @ New York Islanders (2002–03) ||7–1–1–0 || 
|- align="center" bgcolor="#CCFFCC" 
|10||W||November 3, 2002||3–2 || align="left"| @ New York Rangers (2002–03) ||8–1–1–0 || 
|- align="center" bgcolor="#CCFFCC" 
|11||W||November 5, 2002||5–2 || align="left"| @ Montreal Canadiens (2002–03) ||9–1–1–0 || 
|- align="center" bgcolor="#FFBBBB"
|12||L||November 7, 2002||2–5 || align="left"| Columbus Blue Jackets (2002–03) ||9–2–1–0 || 
|- align="center" bgcolor="#CCFFCC" 
|13||W||November 9, 2002||6–3 || align="left"| Toronto Maple Leafs (2002–03) ||10–2–1–0 || 
|- align="center" bgcolor="#FFBBBB"
|14||L||November 12, 2002||3–6 || align="left"| @ Vancouver Canucks (2002–03) ||10–3–1–0 || 
|- align="center" bgcolor="#FFBBBB"
|15||L||November 15, 2002||0–5 || align="left"| @ Edmonton Oilers (2002–03) ||10–4–1–0 || 
|- align="center" bgcolor="#CCFFCC" 
|16||W||November 16, 2002||1–0 || align="left"| @ Calgary Flames (2002–03) ||11–4–1–0 || 
|- align="center" bgcolor="#FFBBBB"
|17||L||November 20, 2002||2–3 || align="left"| @ Columbus Blue Jackets (2002–03) ||11–5–1–0 || 
|- align="center" bgcolor="#CCFFCC" 
|18||W||November 21, 2002||3–2 OT|| align="left"| Los Angeles Kings (2002–03) ||12–5–1–0 || 
|- align="center" bgcolor="#FFBBBB"
|19||L||November 23, 2002||1–3 || align="left"| Colorado Avalanche (2002–03) ||12–6–1–0 || 
|- align="center" bgcolor="#FFBBBB"
|20||L||November 25, 2002||1–4 || align="left"| San Jose Sharks (2002–03) ||12–7–1–0 || 
|- align="center" 
|21||T||November 27, 2002||4–4 OT|| align="left"| @ Colorado Avalanche (2002–03) ||12–7–2–0 || 
|- align="center" bgcolor="#CCFFCC" 
|22||W||November 29, 2002||7–2 || align="left"| Calgary Flames (2002–03) ||13–7–2–0 || 
|- align="center" bgcolor="#FF6F6F"
|23||OTL||November 30, 2002||4–5 OT|| align="left"| New Jersey Devils (2002–03) ||13–7–2–1 || 
|-

|- align="center" bgcolor="#CCFFCC" 
|24||W||December 3, 2002||4–0 || align="left"| @ Boston Bruins (2002–03) ||14–7–2–1 || 
|- align="center" 
|25||T||December 5, 2002||2–2 OT|| align="left"| Ottawa Senators (2002–03) ||14–7–3–1 || 
|- align="center" bgcolor="#CCFFCC" 
|26||W||December 7, 2002||3–1 || align="left"| @ Philadelphia Flyers (2002–03) ||15–7–3–1 || 
|- align="center" bgcolor="#FF6F6F"
|27||OTL||December 8, 2002||3–4 OT|| align="left"| @ Detroit Red Wings (2002–03) ||15–7–3–2 || 
|- align="center" bgcolor="#FFBBBB"
|28||L||December 10, 2002||0–2 || align="left"| @ New Jersey Devils (2002–03) ||15–8–3–2 || 
|- align="center" 
|29||T||December 12, 2002||2–2 OT|| align="left"| @ Nashville Predators (2002–03) ||15–8–4–2 || 
|- align="center" bgcolor="#CCFFCC" 
|30||W||December 14, 2002||4–0 || align="left"| Atlanta Thrashers (2002–03) ||16–8–4–2 || 
|- align="center" bgcolor="#FFBBBB"
|31||L||December 17, 2002||2–6 || align="left"| @ Los Angeles Kings (2002–03) ||16–9–4–2 || 
|- align="center" bgcolor="#FFBBBB"
|32||L||December 18, 2002||2–5 || align="left"| @ Mighty Ducks of Anaheim (2002–03) ||16–10–4–2 || 
|- align="center" 
|33||T||December 20, 2002||3–3 OT|| align="left"| @ Phoenix Coyotes (2002–03) ||16–10–5–2 || 
|- align="center" bgcolor="#CCFFCC" 
|34||W||December 23, 2002||5–0 || align="left"| Los Angeles Kings (2002–03) ||17–10–5–2 || 
|- align="center" bgcolor="#CCFFCC" 
|35||W||December 26, 2002||3–2 || align="left"| Colorado Avalanche (2002–03) ||18–10–5–2 || 
|- align="center" bgcolor="#CCFFCC" 
|36||W||December 28, 2002||6–1 || align="left"| @ Columbus Blue Jackets (2002–03) ||19–10–5–2 || 
|- align="center" bgcolor="#CCFFCC" 
|37||W||December 29, 2002||5–2 || align="left"| Columbus Blue Jackets (2002–03) ||20–10–5–2 || 
|- align="center" bgcolor="#FFBBBB"
|38||L||December 31, 2002||1–5 || align="left"| @ Detroit Red Wings (2002–03) ||20–11–5–2 || 
|-

|- align="center" bgcolor="#FFBBBB"
|39||L||January 2, 2003||1–4 || align="left"| Chicago Blackhawks (2002–03) ||20–12–5–2 || 
|- align="center" bgcolor="#CCFFCC" 
|40||W||January 4, 2003||5–1 || align="left"| Tampa Bay Lightning (2002–03) ||21–12–5–2 || 
|- align="center" bgcolor="#FF6F6F"
|41||OTL||January 7, 2003||1–2 OT|| align="left"| @ Nashville Predators (2002–03) ||21–12–5–3 || 
|- align="center" bgcolor="#CCFFCC" 
|42||W||January 9, 2003||4–1 || align="left"| @ San Jose Sharks (2002–03) ||22–12–5–3 || 
|- align="center" bgcolor="#CCFFCC" 
|43||W||January 11, 2003||2–1 || align="left"| @ Los Angeles Kings (2002–03) ||23–12–5–3 || 
|- align="center" bgcolor="#FFBBBB"
|44||L||January 12, 2003||1–2 || align="left"| @ Mighty Ducks of Anaheim (2002–03) ||23–13–5–3 || 
|- align="center" bgcolor="#CCFFCC" 
|45||W||January 14, 2003||4–1 || align="left"| @ Phoenix Coyotes (2002–03) ||24–13–5–3 || 
|- align="center" bgcolor="#FF6F6F"
|46||OTL||January 16, 2003||2–3 OT|| align="left"| New York Islanders (2002–03) ||24–13–5–4 || 
|- align="center" bgcolor="#CCFFCC" 
|47||W||January 18, 2003||4–2 || align="left"| Chicago Blackhawks (2002–03) ||25–13–5–4 || 
|- align="center" bgcolor="#CCFFCC" 
|48||W||January 20, 2003||5–3 || align="left"| @ Carolina Hurricanes (2002–03) ||26–13–5–4 || 
|- align="center" bgcolor="#FFBBBB"
|49||L||January 21, 2003||4–8 || align="left"| @ Atlanta Thrashers (2002–03) ||26–14–5–4 || 
|- align="center" 
|50||T||January 23, 2003||3–3 OT|| align="left"| @ Chicago Blackhawks (2002–03) ||26–14–6–4 || 
|- align="center" bgcolor="#FFBBBB"
|51||L||January 25, 2003||2–4 || align="left"| Dallas Stars (2002–03) ||26–15–6–4 || 
|- align="center" bgcolor="#CCFFCC" 
|52||W||January 28, 2003||5–3 || align="left"| @ Washington Capitals (2002–03) ||27–15–6–4 || 
|- align="center" bgcolor="#CCFFCC" 
|53||W||January 30, 2003||2–1 OT|| align="left"| Buffalo Sabres (2002–03) ||28–15–6–4 || 
|-

|- align="center" 
|54||T||February 5, 2003||2–2 OT|| align="left"| @ Dallas Stars (2002–03) ||28–15–7–4 || 
|- align="center" 
|55||T||February 6, 2003||4–4 OT|| align="left"| New York Rangers (2002–03) ||28–15–8–4 || 
|- align="center" bgcolor="#CCFFCC" 
|56||W||February 8, 2003||4–1 || align="left"| San Jose Sharks (2002–03) ||29–15–8–4 || 
|- align="center" bgcolor="#CCFFCC" 
|57||W||February 11, 2003||3–2 || align="left"| @ Buffalo Sabres (2002–03) ||30–15–8–4 || 
|- align="center" bgcolor="#FF6F6F"
|58||OTL||February 13, 2003||3–4 OT|| align="left"| Philadelphia Flyers (2002–03) ||30–15–8–5 || 
|- align="center" bgcolor="#FFBBBB"
|59||L||February 15, 2003||3–5 || align="left"| Phoenix Coyotes (2002–03) ||30–16–8–5 || 
|- align="center" bgcolor="#CCFFCC" 
|60||W||February 17, 2003||5–3 || align="left"| Calgary Flames (2002–03) ||31–16–8–5 || 
|- align="center" bgcolor="#FFBBBB"
|61||L||February 20, 2003||2–4 || align="left"| Vancouver Canucks (2002–03) ||31–17–8–5 || 
|- align="center" bgcolor="#FF6F6F"
|62||OTL||February 22, 2003||1–2 OT|| align="left"| @ Pittsburgh Penguins (2002–03) ||31–17–8–6 || 
|- align="center" bgcolor="#FFBBBB"
|63||L||February 23, 2003||1–3 || align="left"| @ Minnesota Wild (2002–03) ||31–18–8–6 || 
|- align="center" bgcolor="#CCFFCC" 
|64||W||February 27, 2003||4–1 || align="left"| Edmonton Oilers (2002–03) ||32–18–8–6 || 
|-

|- align="center" bgcolor="#CCFFCC" 
|65||W||March 1, 2003||2–0 || align="left"| Minnesota Wild (2002–03) ||33–18–8–6 || 
|- align="center" bgcolor="#CCFFCC" 
|66||W||March 4, 2003||2–1 OT|| align="left"| Nashville Predators (2002–03) ||34–18–8–6 || 
|- align="center" bgcolor="#CCFFCC" 
|67||W||March 6, 2003||6–3 || align="left"| Phoenix Coyotes (2002–03) ||35–18–8–6 || 
|- align="center" bgcolor="#FFBBBB"
|68||L||March 7, 2003||2–7 || align="left"| @ Detroit Red Wings (2002–03) ||35–19–8–6 || 
|- align="center" bgcolor="#CCFFCC" 
|69||W||March 11, 2003||4–2 || align="left"| @ San Jose Sharks (2002–03) ||36–19–8–6 || 
|- align="center" 
|70||T||March 13, 2003||4–4 OT|| align="left"| @ Vancouver Canucks (2002–03) ||36–19–9–6 || 
|- align="center" bgcolor="#CCFFCC" 
|71||W||March 15, 2003||1–0 || align="left"| @ Nashville Predators (2002–03) ||37–19–9–6 || 
|- align="center" bgcolor="#CCFFCC" 
|72||W||March 18, 2003||6–4 || align="left"| Vancouver Canucks (2002–03) ||38–19–9–6 || 
|- align="center" bgcolor="#CCFFCC" 
|73||W||March 20, 2003||3–2 OT|| align="left"| Mighty Ducks of Anaheim (2002–03) ||39–19–9–6 || 
|- align="center" bgcolor="#FFBBBB"
|74||L||March 22, 2003||2–4 || align="left"| Detroit Red Wings (2002–03) ||39–20–9–6 || 
|- align="center" bgcolor="#FFBBBB"
|75||L||March 23, 2003||1–3 || align="left"| @ Dallas Stars (2002–03) ||39–21–9–6 || 
|- align="center" bgcolor="#CCFFCC" 
|76||W||March 26, 2003||1–0 || align="left"| @ Minnesota Wild (2002–03) ||40–21–9–6 || 
|- align="center" bgcolor="#CCFFCC" 
|77||W||March 27, 2003||2–1 || align="left"| Florida Panthers (2002–03) ||41–21–9–6 || 
|- align="center" bgcolor="#FFBBBB"
|78||L||March 29, 2003||2–6 || align="left"| Detroit Red Wings (2002–03) ||41–22–9–6 || 
|- align="center" 
|79||T||March 31, 2003||5–5 OT|| align="left"| Edmonton Oilers (2002–03) ||41–22–10–6 || 
|-

|- align="center" bgcolor="#FFBBBB"
|80||L||April 3, 2003||4–6 || align="left"| Chicago Blackhawks (2002–03) ||41–23–10–6 || 
|- align="center" 
|81||T||April 4, 2003||2–2 OT|| align="left"| @ Chicago Blackhawks (2002–03) ||41–23–11–6 || 
|- align="center" bgcolor="#FFBBBB"
|82||L||April 6, 2003||2–5 || align="left"| @ Colorado Avalanche (2002–03) ||41–24–11–6 || 
|-

|-
| Legend:

Playoffs

|- align="center" bgcolor="#ccffcc"
| 1 || April 10 || St. Louis || 6–0 || Vancouver || || Osgood || 18,514 || Blues lead 1–0 || 
|- align="center" bgcolor="#ffbbbb"
| 2 || April 12 || St. Louis || 1–2 || Vancouver || || Osgood || 18,514 || Series tied 1–1 || 
|- align="center" bgcolor="#ccffcc" 
| 3 || April 14 || Vancouver || 1–3 || St. Louis || || Osgood || 19,699 || Blues lead 2–1 || 
|- align="center" bgcolor="#ccffcc"
| 4 || April 16 || Vancouver || 1–4 || St. Louis || || Osgood || 19,936 || Blues lead 3–1 || 
|- align="center" bgcolor="#ffbbbb"
| 5 || April 18 || St. Louis || 3–5 || Vancouver || || Osgood || 18,514 || Blues lead 3–2 || 
|- align="center" bgcolor="#ffbbbb"
| 6 || April 20 || Vancouver || 4–3 || St. Louis || || Osgood || 19,522 || Series tied 3–3 || 
|- align="center" bgcolor="#ffbbbb"
| 7 || April 22 || St. Louis || 1–4 || Vancouver || || Osgood || 18,514 || Canucks win 4–3 || 
|-

|-
| Legend:

Player statistics

Scoring
 Position abbreviations: C = Center; D = Defense; G = Goaltender; LW = Left Wing; RW = Right Wing
  = Joined team via a transaction (e.g., trade, waivers, signing) during the season. Stats reflect time with the Blues only.
  = Left team via a transaction (e.g., trade, waivers, release) during the season. Stats reflect time with the Blues only.

Goaltending
  = Joined team via a transaction (e.g., trade, waivers, signing) during the season. Stats reflect time with the Blues only.
  = Left team via a transaction (e.g., trade, waivers, release) during the season. Stats reflect time with the Blues only.

Awards and records

Awards

Milestones

Transactions
The Blues were involved in the following transactions from June 14, 2002, the day after the deciding game of the 2002 Stanley Cup Finals, through June 9, 2003, the day of the deciding game of the 2003 Stanley Cup Finals.

Trades

Players acquired

Players lost

Signings

Draft picks
St. Louis's draft picks at the 2002 NHL Entry Draft held at the Air Canada Centre in Toronto, Ontario.

See also
2002–03 NHL season

Notes

References

St. Louis
St. Louis
St. Louis Blues seasons
St
St